Singapore's first public LGBT pride festival, IndigNation, took place during the month of August in 2005, with a second annual IndigNation in August 2006. Previous gay celebrations, exemplified by the Nation parties held annually in Singapore since 2001, were private commercial events held for LGBT recreation, but were also socio-political statements of significance in Singapore gay history and milestones in Singapore's human rights record.

History

Before 2001
Prior to 2001, all events held for LGBT people were private affairs not advertised or even made known to the general public. Most were held indoors, especially on Sunday nights at various mainstream discos which were eager to tap the pink dollar on a day when business from their straight patrons was slow. This phenomenon began in the early 1980s when the police started to turn a blind eye to men disco-dancing with each other, but not during the slow numbers, when they were cautioned by the managements of these venues to "behave". This was done to avoid complaints from heterosexual patrons who were initially invariably present.

By and by, from the mid-1980s onwards, the increasing numbers of gay men flocking to these discos on Sunday nights drove the straight clientele away and the managements were subsequently more inclined to tolerate homosexuals engaging in slow dancing and in tight embrace, as well.

Realising the untapped potential and pent-up demand for LGBT pride events, more and more mainstream discos advertised Sundays as "men's night" to draw the gay crowd. Venues such as Marmota, Niche, Legend and Studebaker's made a healthy profit from their calculated gamble. However, there was still an unmet need on all the other nights of the week.

This chasm was filled by pioneering entrepreneurs, especially Max Lim, who organised weekday private gay events at roving locations such as discos at Far East Plaza along Orchard Road and nightspots like Dancers - the Club and Forbidden city at Clarke Quay. Soon, other gay businessmen set up discos like Taboo and Why Not in Tanjong Pagar, which were exclusively gay on every night of the week.

Breaking out of the claustrophobic confines of indoor venues, Max Lim organised Singapore's first open-air private gay events advertised via leaflets and word-of-mouth at spacious venues such as the East Coast Lagoon and Big Splash. These were a roaring success as they were such a novelty by virtue of the incredible amount of space in which attendees could roam, with food, drink, dancing and individual events on offer. Ground-breaking as these were, they still remained private affairs, out of the radar of the mainstream community and media. As such, the full potential of advertising could not be harnessed, which limited the patronage at these events.

Nation

Nation

After establishing an English-language Web Portal, Fridae.com in the year 2000, scientist and entrepreneur Dr. Stuart Koe tested the socio-political boundaries and organised Singapore's first private, widely advertised public LGBT pride event. Not unexpectedly, along with the government's liberalising trend at the time, the party was given the green light by the police. Koe even managed to secure corporate sponsorship for the historic event. In a move to emphasise the LGBT community's loyalty to the Republic of Singapore, the party was held on 8 August 2001, one day before National Day and was named "Nation".

It was held at Sentosa's Fantasy Island. Over 1500 attendees celebrated both the eve of National Day, as well as their sense of community. Many flew in from Sydney, Malaysia, the United States and Hong Kong. The venue was divided into 3 zones: the Centro Boyz zone where the Miss Devastating drag competition was held, the Womyn's zone where no men were allowed for most of the evening, and the Chill Out area where guests could mingle and booths were set up to sell food, drinks, toys and to distribute flyers. 8 to 10 uniformed Police officers made their obligatory visit at around 11:30 p.m. to check that everything was all right and left without incident after 15 minutes. The mega-do also raised funds for local safe-sex group Action for AIDS (AFA) who received a portion of ticket sales.

Nation.02
Despite initial concerns that there would be Government resistance to another gay Nation party, more than 2500 red-and-white dress-themed people gathered at the Fountain Gardens and Musical Fountain in Sentosa on Thursday 9 August 2003 for Singapore’s 37th birthday and 2nd pride party. Nation.02, co-organised by Fridae and Kinemat Productions was sponsored by Qantas and other corporations including Pepsi, Planet Fitness and The Gallery Hotel. Paying partygoers had a choice of 2 dance areas with top Sydney DJs Luke Leal (long time veteran of the Sydney Gay and Lesbian Mardi Gras) and Mark Alsop (who DJs recurrently at the Mardi Gras Recovery "Frisky" parties); DJ Lisa C. and borhead from Kinemat Productions, co-organiser of the event. They were treated to a specially-produced laser show by Oracle Lasers, percussion by Idham Budiman, and visual effects by Fake from Kinemat. Attendance by regional visitors was even higher than the previous year's bash, drawing close to 500 partygoers, mainly from Hong Kong, Thailand and Taiwan.

Nation.03
Fridae's Nation.03 extravaganza at Sentosa expanded to become a 3-day event in 2003, attracting an estimated 4500 paying attendees intent on celebrating Singapore's 38th National Day. It included a welcome party at Why Not? bar on 7 August and a poolside recovery party on 9 August at the water-theme park Big Splash and Tunnel Club, also located on the same premises. This year's major corporate sponsor was Subaru represented locally by Motor Image Enterprises Pte Ltd. An estimated 1000 partygoers were visitors from Australia, Hong Kong, Japan, Malaysia, Taiwan, Thailand and as far away as Canada and the United States. The Sijori Resort Sentosa, located a few minutes from the party grounds and Hotel 1929, the official hotel for the party, reported a 100 percent occupancy rate during the period. Nation.03 marked a milestone in that it was the first time in Singaporean television history that a local gay event had been reported in a positive light, accompanied by snippets of bare-chested men dancing on podiums. The following day, Channel NewsAsia and its sister station MediaCorp TV Channel 5 announced, 'Nation.03 can be seen as a gauge of Singapore's tolerance.'

Nation.04
Hailed by Time magazine as "a 3-day festival of international proportions,"Nation.04 featured state of the art visual effects, world-class venues, and international circuit DJs from Taiwan, Japan, Australia, USA and Singapore.

The weekend kicked off with a "Make Love, Not War" Opening Party at Suntec City's Singapore International Convention and Exhibition Centre on Saturday 7 August, followed by the main event, Nation at the Sentosa Musical Fountain on 8 August 2004 and the Closing Party at the Zouk Club on 9 August 2004.

For the first time, Nation also included the participation of various arts organisations in an informal "Nation Arts Programme." This included the plays Mergers/Wills by Toy Factory in Mandarin, Top or Bottom and Mardi Gras by The Necessary Stage, and The Revenge of the Dim Sum Dollies by Dream Academy Productions. 2 related art exhibitions were also held during this period, "Red + White = Pink" by Utterly Art and an exhibition by Art Seasons.

The private party was the largest in the series, to date, and attracted more than 8,000 paying revelers, 40% of whom were international visitors. Tourist revenue generated during the festival was estimated to be nearly Sing$6 million, according to data collected by an independent market research firm.

Nation.V (2005)
In April 2005, the Licensing Division of the Singapore Police faxed a rejection of Fridae's application to hold Nation.05, Asian gay and lesbian private party, which had been held annually since National Day in August 2001, citing the event to be 'contrary to public interest.'. Nation.05, slated to coincide with Singapore's 40th birthday, had clinched sponsorship by Motorola for the second consecutive year and Subaru for the third. Dr. Stuart Koe, CEO of Fridae said, 'We are disappointed that the authorities have deemed a National Day celebration by Singapore's gay citizens as being 'contrary to public interest' when it had previously been approved for four years without incident. This is a direct contradiction to previous calls for embracing of diversity.'

Unable to hold the even in Singapore, Fridae changed the venue to Phuket, Thailand. It was held from 4 to 6 November 2005 at 8 venues with DJs and artistes from the United States, Thailand, Australia, Japan, Malaysia, Singapore, New Zealand and Hong Kong. The event helped Phuket's in their effects in recovering their tsunami-devastated economy. It was reported in Australia's Sydney Morning Herald that Singapore's loss was Thailand's gain.

The resulting event had a smaller turnout with less than 1000 partygoers, mainly to local Thais. The Crowne Plaza hotel on Karon Beach was the hosting hotel for the event. The welcome reception was held around the hotel pool, the G.Y.M. party at the Arena disco and the closing after-hours party at the Locker Room.

Snowball parties

SnowBall.04 ban
In early December 2004, the Public Entertainment Licensing Unit (PELU) of the police rejected an application for a public entertainment licence to hold SnowBall.04 on 26 December 2004.
	
It was the first time that a PELU licence had been denied as organiser Jungle Media, a subsidiary of Singapore-based Fridae.com, had successfully obtained licences for all similar past events, namely Snowball in December 2002 and 2003, Nation (August 2002, 2003, 2004), Squirt (April 2004), Boys of Summer (June 2003) and Paradise Ball (December 2003).

Despite the fact that Nation.04 had been nominated for "Best Event Experience" in the 2005 Singapore Tourism Awards, the Police said that, "the event is likely to be organised as a gay party which is contrary to public interest in general".

In a press statement, the Police said the following were taken into consideration:
The promotion materials were widely advertised on Fridae.com, a known gay portal;

Observations during the indoor Opening Ball at Suntec showed that patrons of the same gender were seen openly kissing and intimately touching each other. Some of the revellers were cross-dressed, for example, males wearing skirts. Patrons were also seen using the toilets of the opposite sex. The behaviour of these patrons suggested that most of them were probably gays/lesbians and this was thus an event almost exclusively for gays/lesbians;

A number of couples of the same sex were seen hugging and kissing in public after the event while waiting for taxis and checking into the nearby hotels after the party;

Several letters of complaint were received from some patrons about the openly gay acts at the Ball.

It also said: 
The Police recognise that there are some Singaporeans with gay tendencies. While Police do not discriminate against them on this basis, the Police also recognise that Singapore is still, by and large, a conservative and traditional society. Hence, the Police cannot approve any application for an event which goes against the moral values of a large majority of Singaporeans. Future applications for events of similar nature will be closely scrutinised.

Many gay analysts also felt that in addition to the above reasons given by the police, the concern raised in September 2004 by the Minister of State for Health, Dr. Balaji Sadasivan about the rising numbers of HIV cases in Singapore and his unsubstantiated attribution of the cause to fraternisation between locals and Westerners during gay parties was pivotal in instigating the official policy turnaround.

IndigNation Festival

Singapore's first public LGBT pride festival, IndigNation, took place during the month of August in 2005, with a second annual IndigNation in August 2006.

See also
Pink Dot SG
List of electronic music festivals
Circuit party

References 

LGBT events in Singapore